Memories of a Winter's Night is the compilation album by saxophone player Dave Koz.
Koz's third holiday album contains tracks from previous holiday albums and new tunes. The album was released by Capitol Records on September 18, 2007.

Track listing

Personnel

 Dave Koz - Saxophones, Piano
 Alex Al - Bass
 David Benoit - Piano
 Rick Braun - Trumpet
 Gerry Brown - Drums
 Bridgette Bryant - Background Vocal
 Brian Culbertson - Piano, Keyboards, Percussion, Trombone
 Jim Culbertson - Trumpet
 Paul Jackson Jr. - Guitar
 Brian Kilgore - Percussion
 Jeff Koz - Nylon String Guitar
 Nick Lane - Trombone
 Kimberley Locke - Vocal
 Tony Maiden - Guitar, Vocal
 Eddie Miller - Wurlitzer, B-3 Organ
 Ester Nicholson - Background Vocal

 Ray Parker Jr. - Guitar
 Phil Parlapiano - Keyboards, Guitar
 Fernando Perdomo - Bass
 Doug Pettibone - Guitars
 David Piltch - Acoustic Bass
 Brenda Russell - Vocal
 Bill Sharpe - Bass
 Sandy Simmons - Background Vocal
 Brian Simpson - Keyboards, Piano
 Kelly Sweet - Vocal
 Michael Thompson - Guitar
 Stevo Théard - Drums
 Bruce Watson - Guitars
 Gigi Worth - Background Vocal
 Donn Wyatt - Piano, Keyboards

Charts

References

Dave Koz albums
Capitol Records Christmas albums
Capitol Records compilation albums
Christmas albums by American artists
Christmas compilation albums
Instrumental albums
2007 Christmas albums
2007 compilation albums
Jazz Christmas albums